The men's high jump event at the 2009 World Championships in Berlin, Germany was held between 19 August and 21 August 2009.

The 2008 Olympic gold and silver medallists, Andrey Silnov and Germaine Mason, did not compete at the Championships and the reigning world champion, Donald Thomas had been in poor form that season. The Russian duo, Yaroslav Rybakov and world leader Ivan Ukhov, were the most favoured athletes. The 2005 world champion Yuriy Krymarenko and Olympic medallist Kyriakos Ioannou had performed sub-par prior to the competition. Andrey Tereshin, Jaroslav Bába and host representative Raúl Spank rounded out the likely medal candidates. In the qualification round, the two past champions (Thomas and Krymarenko) failed to make the qualifying mark of 2.30 m. All the favourites progressed, with Kyriakos Ioannou topping the rankings, while Mickael Hanany and Motswana Kabelo Kgosiemang jumped season's best to make the final.

The final, held on 21 August, was delayed by 90 minutes due to heavy rainfall in Berlin, and this produced much lower results compared to the qualification for a majority of the jumpers. No medalling athlete reached the qualifying mark of 2.30 m that they had two days previously. Ivan Ukhov, who had a season's best of 2.40 m, finished with a best of 2.23 m, and Andra Manson similarly failed to match expectations. Only Rybakov, Ioannou, Spank and Sylwester Bednarek passed the 2.28 m height. Rybakov and Ioannou passed 2.32 m on their first attempts, while the other two athletes took two jumps for the height which were personal bests. These turned out to be the final passes of the competition and Rybakov beat Ioannou to the gold by having one less failed attempt in the competition, while Spank and Bednarek shared the bronze honours.

This was Rybakov's first gold after three silvers in past world championships. Ioannou was Cyprus' only medallist from the championships that year. Joint-third Bednarek was a surprise medallist given that this was his first senior outdoor competition and he had started the season with a best of 2.26 m. The winning result of 2.32 m was the lowest winning result in the history of high jumping finals in the World Championships in Athletics, shared with the finals of 1983 and 2005.

Medalists

Records

Qualification standards

Schedule

Results

Qualification
Qualification: Qualifying Performance 2.30 (Q) or at least 12 best performers (q) advance to the final.

Key:  Q = qualification by place in heat, q = qualification by overall place, SB = Seasonal best

Final

Key:  PB = Personal best, SB = Seasonal best

References
General
High jump results. IAAF. Retrieved on 2009-10-21.
Specific

High jump
High jump at the World Athletics Championships